Notre Dame High School is a local, catchment based state funded secondary school for girls, located on Observatory Road in Glasgow, Scotland.  It was founded in 1897 as a fee paying school for girls. Notre Dame High was the last remaining single sex council school in Scotland until November 2019.

History

In 1894 Archbishop Eyre of Glasgow invited the Sisters of Notre Dame to come from the Mother House in Liverpool to establish a community in Glasgow. The Notre Dame Training College was opened in 1895 at Dowanhill. In 1897 Notre Dame School was opened as a private school, with a roll of 24 pupils, instructed by two teachers. By 1912, the number of pupils had risen to 193. Overcrowding led to proposals for a new building.  This was designed by Thomas Cordiner in 1939, but due to the outbreak of war construction was delayed, and the building opened in 1953. In 1987, the school was protected as a category A listed building. At the same time as proposals to close the school were defeated.  The former high school building and adjoining primary school building and church were damaged in a fire on 12 June 2010.

The single-sex entry criteria has been a controversial issue. Local parents campaigned for the school to become co-educational in the 1990s but the bid failed at Council committee level.

In 2016, a new campaign group of local school parents (NDH4ALL) was established to ask Glasgow City Council to reconsider the single sex entry criteria and allow access to both girls and boys in the local catchment area.

A public consultation on Notre Dame High's entry criteria was launched in March 2019 and ran for a period of 10 weeks. The consultation received a high level of publicity and engagement, with almost 5000 responses counted. Glasgow City Council also conducted three high profile public meetings during the consultation period. The meetings saw attendance in the hundreds with many pupils speaking of their experiences.

Consultation results were released in August 2019 revealing that, of the three options proposed, co-education received the highest number of responses (45.7%).

In November 2019 a consultation response report was published by Glasgow City Council Education Services in conjunction with Education Scotland. The report recommended that Notre Dame High become co-educational. A final vote on the recommendation by the Glasgow City Council City Administration Committee took place on 28 November 2019, with the committee unanimously voting to make the school co-educational.

The Head Teacher is Mrs Rosemary Martin who succeeded Philomena McFadden in 2014.

Alumnae

Lady Elish Frances Angiolini, Former Lord Advocate of Scotland
Maureen Beattie, Actress
Helena Carroll, Actress
Marcella Evaristi, Playwright
 Anne Ferguson (1941-1998), physician, clinical researcher and expert in inflammatory bowel disease.
Clare Grogan, Singer, actress
Kate Robinson, Sculptor

See also
List of Category A listed buildings in Glasgow
List of post-war Category A listed buildings in Scotland

References

External links
 
 Notre Dame High School's page on Scottish Schools Online.
 http://www.ndh4all.net
 https://blogs.glowscotland.org.uk/gc/ndhs/

Educational institutions established in 1897
Sisters of Notre Dame de Namur schools
Catholic secondary schools in Glasgow
Girls' schools in Glasgow
Category A listed buildings in Glasgow
Listed schools in Scotland
1897 establishments in Scotland